Woden Interchange is located in Woden Town Centre, Canberra adjacent to Westfield Woden. It is served by ACTION and CDC Canberra services.

History
In March 1972, the National Capital Development Commission awarded Leighton Contractors a contract to build Woden bus station. It opened on 4 December 1972. On 6 December 1982 an upgrade was completed that doubled its size and included heated waiting rooms. In 1994 a further upgrade was completed.

Having been named Woden bus station since it opened, in April 2019 it was renamed Woden Interchange. It is to be replaced by a new interchange with a Canberra Institute of Technology campus to open on the old site in 2025.

Services
Woden Interchange is served by ACTION and CDC Canberra services.

References

External links

Bus stations in Australia
Bus transport in Canberra
Transport buildings and structures in the Australian Capital Territory
Transport infrastructure completed in 1972
1972 establishments in Australia